William Thomas "Bill" Quick (born 1946), who sometimes writes under the pseudonym Margaret Allan, is a science fiction author and self-described libertarian conservative blogger.  Quick is the author of 28 novels, the most famous of which is the cyberpunk Dreams of Flesh and Sand, and co-authored a six-novel series with William Shatner.

Quick runs the conservative blog Daily Pundit.

Personal life 

Quick is originally from Indiana and now lives in Hunters Point, San Francisco, California.

He graduated from The Hill School in 1964.

Books 
Quick is the author of 28 novels, the most famous of which is Dreams of Flesh and Sand.  He co-authored the six novel Quest for Tomorrow series with William Shatner.  He has also written a series of prehistoric adventure novels under the pen name Margaret Allan, the best selling of which was The Last Mammoth.

Quick's 2014 novel Lightning Fall, a disaster thriller,  was  featured in a USA Today column  by Instapundit's Glenn Reynolds.  Quick's novel and Reynold's column were commented on by other libertarian sources.

Blog "Daily Pundit" 

Quick started blogging at Daily Pundit in 2001. It continues as a group blog.

The word "blogosphere" is due to Quick, who proposed it on Daily Pundit in 2001.

American Conservative Party 
In February 2008, Quick was among those involved (he describes himself as "the guy who dreamed up the damned name of the party, registered it, built your first web site, and gave you your first publicity") in the creation of a third party called the American Conservative Party as an alternative to the Democratic and Republican parties. He has since repudiated this organization repeatedly on his blog.

W. T. Quick Blog 

In July 2011, Quick started the blog W.T. Quick to blog about his writing and publishing efforts past, present and future.

See also 

 Warblog

References

External links
 W. T. Quick's Home Page
 

American science fiction writers
Allan, Margaret
Allan, Margaret
American bloggers
Writers from San Francisco
Living people
The Hill School alumni
American libertarians
20th-century American novelists
21st-century American novelists
1946 births
American male novelists
20th-century American male writers
21st-century American male writers
American male bloggers